Marquban (Arabic: مرقوبان) is a village in Sitra, Bahrain, located near the middle part of the island.

Sitra
Populated places in Bahrain